9023 Mnesthus  is a large Jupiter trojan from the Trojan camp, approximately  in diameter. It was discovered on 10 September 1988, by American astronomer couple Carolyn and Eugene Shoemaker at the Palomar Observatory in California. The dark Jovian asteroid belongs to the 100 largest Jupiter trojans and has a longer-than-average rotation period of 30.7 hours. It was named after the Trojan Mnestheus, a companion of Aeneas in Classical mythology.

Orbit and classification 

Mnesthus is a dark Jovian asteroid in a 1:1 orbital resonance with Jupiter. It is located in the trailering Trojan camp at the Gas Giant's  Lagrangian point, 60° behind its orbit . It is also a non-family asteroid of the Jovian background population.

It orbits the Sun at a distance of 4.9–5.6 AU once every 11 years and 11 months (4,365 days; semi-major axis of 5.23 AU). Its orbit has an eccentricity of 0.06 and an inclination of 24° with respect to the ecliptic. The body's observation arc begins with a precovery at Palomar in July 1950, more than 38 years prior to its official discovery observation.

Naming 

This minor planet was named from Greco-Roman mythology after the Trojan Mnestheus, a companion and officer of Aeneas in Classical mythology. He is one of the wandering Aeneads who traveled to Italy after the downfall of Troy. At the funeral games for Aeneas' father, Anchises, he competes in both the sailing and the archery contests, winning second place in sailing. The official naming citation was published by the Minor Planet Center on 13 October 2000.

Physical characteristics 

Mnesthus is an assumed C-type asteroid. Jovian asteroids are typically D-types, with the remainder being mostly carbonaceous C- and primitive P-type asteroids.

Rotation period 

In August 2011, a rotational lightcurve of Mnesthus was obtained from photometric observations by Daniel Coley and Robert Stephens at the Center for Solar System Studies and GMARS , respectively. Lightcurve analysis gave a longer-than average rotation period of  hours with a brightness amplitude of 0.23 magnitude.

Diameter and albedo 

According to the surveys carried out by the NEOWISE mission of NASA's Wide-field Infrared Survey Explorer and the Japanese Akari satellite, Mnesthus measures 49.15 and 60.80 kilometers in diameter and its surface has an albedo of 0.073 and 0.033, respectively. The Collaborative Asteroid Lightcurve Link assumes a standard albedo for a carbonaceous asteroid of 0.057 and calculates a diameter of 50.77 kilometers based on an absolute magnitude of 10.2.

Notes

References

External links 
 Asteroid Lightcurve Database (LCDB), query form (info )
 Dictionary of Minor Planet Names, Google books
 Discovery Circumstances: Numbered Minor Planets (5001)-(10000) – Minor Planet Center
 Asteroid 9023 Mnesthus at the Small Bodies Data Ferret
 
 

009023
Discoveries by Carolyn S. Shoemaker
Discoveries by Eugene Merle Shoemaker
Named minor planets
19880910